Ludworth Tower was a manor house and later a pele tower in the pit village of Ludworth, County Durham. Only ruins survive today.

Ludworth Tower was built by the de Ludworth family and it passed into the hands of the Holden family, who added the tower in 1411. Roger Holden gained a licence on 6 August 1422 to crenelate Ludworth Tower to Thomas Holden by Cardinal Thomas Langley and during the same year Thomas added a rectangular pele tower to the structure which was at least three storeys high. In 1785 W. Hutchinson noted that Ludworth Tower was a ruin. In 1890, most of the ruins collapsed, leaving only the ruins that survive today extant. In 1905 a ditch was apparently discovered near the tower but no signs of the ditch survive today. The only surviving remains are the barrel-vaulted basement, the three storey west wall and fragments of a first floor spiral stair in the south wall.

References 

Manor houses in England
Buildings and structures completed in 1411